Ecco fatto is a 1998 Italian film directed by Gabriele Muccino.

Plot

Cast

 Giorgio Pasotti: Matteo
 Claudio Santamaria: Piterone
 Barbora Bobuľová: Margherita
 Enrico Silvestrin: Paolo
 Ginevra Colonna: Floriana
 Stefano Abbati: preside
 Gigio Alberti: Gigio
 Sergio Rubini: parcheggiatore abusivo

See also   
 List of Italian films of 1998

External links
 

1998 films
Films directed by Gabriele Muccino
Italian comedy films
1998 directorial debut films
1990s Italian-language films
1990s Italian films